Macronemata elaphia is a moth of the family Oecophoridae. It was described by Edward Meyrick in 1883. It is found in Australia (the Australian Capital Territory, New South Wales and Tasmania) and New Zealand.

References

 Macronemata elaphia in uniprot

Moths described in 1883
Oecophoridae